"Man Aamadeh Am" is a Persian song, sung by Iranian singer Googoosh for the album Pol in 1975. The song was written by Googoosh’s Afghan friend Jalil Zaland and gifted to Googoosh after she visited Afghanistan.

2015 version 

In 2015, Pakistani singers Atif Aslam and Gul Panra performed the song during Coke Studio season 8, episode 3. It was produced by Strings. The music video of the song features Atif Aslam and Gul Panra. It received 37,000 shares on Social media within five hours of its release. The video has received over 114 million views on YouTube as of November 2022.

Credits 

 Artists – Atif Aslam and Gul Panra 
Composer - Jalil Zaland
Producer – Strings
 Guest Musicians – Tanveer Tafu (Rubab), Arsalan Rabbani ( Harmonium)
 Houseband – Aahad Nayani (Drums), Babar Khanna (Tabla/Dholak), Haider Ali (Keyboards), Imran Akhoond (Guitars), Jaffer Zaidi (Piano/String Section Arrangements), Omran Shafique (Guitars), Kamran ‘mannu’ Zafar (Bass), Sikandar Mufti (Percussions)
 String Section – Javed Iqbal, (Head Violinist), Islamuddin Meer (violin), Manzoor Ahmed (violin), Saeed Ahmed (violin)
 Backing Vocalists – Momin Durrani, Rachel Viccaji, Sara Haider

References 

Urdu-language songs
Atif Aslam songs
Coke Studio (Pakistani TV program)
Pakistani songs
Persian-language songs
1975 songs
2015 singles
Pop ballads